Sud Chichas (or: Sur Chichas) is a province in the Bolivian department of Potosí. Its seat is Tupiza.

Location
Sud Chichas province is one of sixteen provinces in the Potosí Department. It is located between 20° 51' and 21° 50' South and between 65° 15' and 66° 30' West. It borders Nor Chichas Province in the north, Antonio Quijarro Province in the north-west,
Nor Lípez Province and Sur Lípez Province in the west, the Republic of Argentina and Modesto Omiste Province in the south, Tarija Department in the south-east, and Chuquisaca Department in the east.

The province extends over 130 km from east to west and from north to south.

Division
The province comprises two municipalities which are further subdivided into cantons.

Population
The main language of the province is Spanish, spoken by 96%, while 59% of the population speak Quechua. The population dropped from 52,308 inhabitants (1992 census) to 47,873 (2001 census), a decrease of 8.5%.

45% of the population have no access to electricity, 74% have no sanitary facilities. 34% of the population are employed in agriculture, 11% in mining, 6% in industry, 49% in general services. 88% of the population are Catholics, 8% Protestants.

The people are predominantly indigenous citizens of Quechua descent.

See also 
 Kunturillu
 Wila Qullu

References 

Population data (Spanish)

Provinces of Potosí Department